Ioannis Arzoumanidis (born October 22, 1986) is a male freestyle wrestler from Greece.

Championships and accomplishments

MMA
MMA Challenge Pro
MMA Challenge Pro Heavyweight Champion (2 Title Defences)

Mixed martial arts record

|Win
|align=center|7–1
|Mehmet Ozer
|TKO (punches)
|MCP 10
|
|align=center|1
|align=center|2:06
|Thessaloniki, Greece
|
|-
|Loss
|align=center| 6–1  
|Denis Smoldarev
|TKO (punches)
|ACA 97: Goncharov vs. Johnson 2
|
|align=center| 1
|align=center| 3:35
|Krasnodar, Russia
|  
|-
|Win
|align=center|6–0
|Amirkhan Isagadzhiev
|TKO (punches)
|ACA 94: Bagov vs. Khaliev 
|
|align=center|2
|align=center|2:21
|Krasnodar, Russia
|
|-
| Win
|align=center|5–0
|Mehmet Ozer
|TKO (Punches)
|GFC 8 - Greek Fighting Championship 8
|
|align=center|1
|align=center|1:32
|Thessaloniki, Greece
|
|-
| Win
|align=center|4–0
|Archontis Taxiarchis
|TKO (Punches)
|MMA Challenge Pro 4
|
|align=center|1
|align=center|2:32
|Thessaloniki, Greece
|
|-
| Win
|align=center|3–0
|Nestoras Batzelas
|Decision (unanimous)
|MMA Challenge Pro 2 
|
|align=center|3
|align=center|5:00
|Thessaloniki, Greece
|
|-
| Win
|align=center|2–0
|Victor Svetlinskin
|Submission (guillotine choke)
|MMA Challenge Pro 
|
|align=center|2
|align=center|1:40
|Thessaloniki, Greece
|
|-
| Win
|align=center|1–0
|Themis Andreev
|TKO (punches)
|Night of the Champions
|
|align=center|1
|align=center|1:20
|Faliraki, Greece
|
|-

See also 
 List of current ACA fighters
 List of male mixed martial artists

References

External links
 Profile on Sherdog.com
 Bio on fila-wrestling.com

Living people
1986 births
Greek male sport wrestlers
European Games competitors for Greece
Wrestlers at the 2015 European Games
World Wrestling Championships medalists
Greek male mixed martial artists
Mixed martial artists utilizing freestyle wrestling
Mediterranean Games silver medalists for Greece
Competitors at the 2009 Mediterranean Games
Mediterranean Games medalists in wrestling
Sportspeople from Thessaloniki